Ephrin A1 is a protein that in humans is encoded by the EFNA1 gene.

This gene encodes a member of the ephrin (EPH) family. The ephrins and EPH-related receptors comprise the largest subfamily of receptor protein-tyrosine kinases and have been implicated in mediating developmental events, especially in the nervous system and in erythropoiesis. Based on their structures and sequence relationships, ephrins are divided into the ephrin-A (EFNA) class, which are anchored to the membrane by a glycosylphosphatidylinositol linkage, and the ephrin-B (EFNB) class, which are transmembrane proteins. This gene encodes an EFNA class ephrin which binds to the EPHA2, EPHA4, EPHA5, EPHA6, and EPHA7 receptors. Two transcript variants that encode different isoforms were identified through sequence analysis.

Model organisms 

Model organisms have been used in the study of EFNA1 function. A conditional knockout mouse line, called Efna1tm1a(EUCOMM)Wtsi was generated as part of the International Knockout Mouse Consortium program—a high-throughput mutagenesis project to generate and distribute animal models of disease to interested scientists.

Male and female animals underwent a standardized phenotypic screen to determine the effects of deletion. Twenty four tests were carried out on homozygous mutant mice and one significant abnormality was observed: a transformation in vertebral number from lumbar vertebrae to sacral vertebrae.

References

Further reading 

 
 
 
 
 
 
 
 
 
 
 
 
 
 

Genes mutated in mice